Kiera  is a female given name. It is an Anglicized version of Ciara, the name of a 7th-century saint, and means 'dark' or 'dark haired ' in Irish.

People with this name
Kiera Aitken (born 1983), swimmer from Bermuda
Kiera Allen (born 1997), American actress
Kiera Austin (born 1997), Australian netball player
Kiera Bennett (born 1971), painter from England
Kiera Cass (born 1981), American author
Kiera Chaplin (born 1982), British actress and model
Kiera Duffy (born 1979), American opera singer
Kiera Gazzard (born 2001), Australian swimmer
Kiera Gormley, model from Northern Ireland
Kiera Hogan (born 1994), American professional wrestler
Kiera Van Ryk (born 1999), Canadian volleyball player
Kiera Skeels (born 2001), English footballer

See also
Keira (given name)
Kira (given name), alternate Anglicization (and name with other origins also)
List of Irish-language given names

References

Feminine given names